Linus Arnesson (born September 21, 1994) is a Swedish professional ice hockey defenceman. He is currently playing with Djurgårdens IF in the HockeyAllsvenskan (Allsv). Arnesson was selected by the Boston Bruins in the 2nd round (60th overall) of the 2013 NHL Entry Draft.

Playing career
Arnesson played in his native Sweden as a youth within Djurgårdens IF organization. On June 1, 2014, Arnesson was signed by the Boston Bruins to a three-year entry-level contract.

After the conclusion of the 2014–15 SHL season, Arnesson made his way over to America to join the Bruins AHL affiliate, the Providence Bruins.

Arnesson played two full seasons in the American Hockey League with Providence, however was unable to make an impact within the Bruins prospect ranks. At the conclusion of his entry-level deal, Arnesson as an impending restricted free agent, opted to return to continue his career in Sweden, in agreeing to an optional three-year deal with Örebro HK on June 1, 2017.

Arnesson played two seasons with Örebro HK, leaving as a free agent following the 2018–19 season. He signed a two-year contract to remain in the SHL with Färjestad BK on April 24, 2019.

Career statistics

Regular season and playoffs

International

References

External links

1994 births
Living people
Boston Bruins draft picks
Djurgårdens IF Hockey players
Färjestad BK players
Örebro HK players
Providence Bruins players
Ice hockey people from Stockholm
Swedish ice hockey defencemen